Normal heights is a type of height above sea level introduced by Mikhail Molodenskii.
The normal height  (or ) of a point is computed as the ratio of a point's geopotential number (i.e. its geopotential difference with that of sea level), by the average, normal gravity computed along the plumb line of the point.

Normal heights are thus dependent upon the reference ellipsoid chosen. The Soviet Union and many other Eastern European countries have chosen a height system based on normal heights, determined by geodetic precise levelling.  Normal gravity values are easy to compute and "hypothesis-free", i.e., one does not have to know, as one would for computing orthometric heights, the density of the Earth's crust around the plumb line.

The reference surface that normal heights are measured from is called the quasi-geoid (or quasigeoid), a representation of mean sea level similar to the geoid and close to it, but lacking the physical interpretation of an equipotential surface. The geoid undulation  with respect to the reference ellipsoid:

finds an analogue in the so-called height anomaly, :

The maximum geoid–quasigeoid separation (GQS), is on the order of 5 meters in the Himalayas.

Alternatives include orthometric heights (geoid-based) and dynamic heights.

See also
Physical geodesy

References  

Vertical position
Geodesy